Overseas Chinese High School, Daegu is a Republic of China (Taiwan)-oriented Chinese international school in Nam-gu, Daegu, South Korea, serving middle and high school students. The school opened on 1 September 1958.

References

External links

 Overseas Chinese High School, Daegu 

Chinese diaspora in Korea
International schools in Daegu
Taiwanese international schools in South Korea
1958 establishments in South Korea
Educational institutions established in 1958